Rainsboro is an unincorporated community in Paint Township, Highland County, Ohio, United States.

History
Rainsboro was named for John Rains, the original owner of the town site. A post office was established at Rainsboro in 1893, and remained in operation until it was discontinued in 1966.

Notable person
Joseph B. Foraker, 37th Governor of Ohio, was born near Rainsboro in 1846.

Gallery

References

Unincorporated communities in Highland County, Ohio
Unincorporated communities in Ohio